The discography of Broadcast, an English indie electronic band, consists of three studio albums, one collaborative mini album, one soundtrack album, two compilation albums, seven extended plays and seven singles.

Broadcast were formed in Birmingham in 1995 by vocalist Trish Keenan, bassist James Cargill, keyboardist Roj Stevens and guitarist Tim Felton. The band released their debut single, "Accidentals", on the independent record label Wurlitzer Jukebox in 1996; their two subsequent releases, The Book Lovers EP (1996) and "Living Room" (1997), were released on Duophonic Records. Soon after, the band signed to the Warp label and released Work and Non Work, a compilation of the band's previously released material. In 2000, Broadcast released their debut studio album, The Noise Made by People, and two EPs titled Extended Play and Extended Play Two. The Noise Made by People did not have a commercial impact, peaking only at No. 79 on the UK Albums Chart, but its accompanying EPs were a minor success, placing at No. 1 and No. 2, respectively, on the UK Budget Albums Chart.

Haha Sound, the band's second album, was released in 2003 to "universal acclaim", according to Metacritic. The album experienced moderate commercial success in the United States, where it peaked at No. 8 on Billboards Electronic Albums chart and No. 50 on the Independent Albums chart. Haha Sound was preceded by two EPs, Microtronics Volume 01: Stereo Recorded Music for Links and Bridges and Pendulum (2003). Tender Buttons, the final studio album to feature Keenan, was released in 2005, alongside Microtronics Volume 02.

Following the release of the B-side and rarities compilation The Future Crayon (2006), Broadcast began collaborating with Julian House and his project the Focus Group. In 2009, Broadcast and House released a collaborative mini album, Broadcast and the Focus Group Investigate Witch Cults of the Radio Age, which was listed as No. 1 on The Wires Top 50 Releases of 2009 and referred to by Vices Noisey as "perhaps Broadcast's finest achievement". A split 7-inch single with the Focus Group, featuring Broadcast's song "Inside Out", followed the album's release.

Keenan died in January 2011, following complications with pneumonia, which she suffered from after earlier contracting H1N1. Berberian Sound Studio, a soundtrack album to Peter Strickland's 2012 film of the same name, was released in January 2013 to moderate success in the UK and US, peaking at No. 24 on the UK Independent Albums Chart. Partially recorded prior to Keenan's death, it was the final Broadcast release to feature her vocals.

Albums

Studio albums

Mini albums

Soundtrack albums

Compilation albums

Extended plays

Singles

Retail singles

Promotional singles

Split singles

Music videos

References

External links

Discographies of British artists
Electronic music group discographies